Jean-Jacques Candelier (born 7 March 1945 in Bugnicourt, Nord) is a member of the National Assembly of France.  He represents the Nord department,  and is a member of the Gauche démocrate et républicaine.

References

1945 births
Living people
People from Nord (French department)
Politicians from Hauts-de-France
French Communist Party politicians
Deputies of the 13th National Assembly of the French Fifth Republic
Deputies of the 14th National Assembly of the French Fifth Republic